And a Little Child Shall Lead Them is a 1909 American silent short drama film directed by D. W. Griffith. A print of the film exists in the film archive of the Library of Congress.

Cast
 Marion Leonard as The Mother
 Arthur V. Johnson as The Father
 Adele DeGarde as The Daughter
 David Miles as The Lawyer
 Anita Hendrie as The Maid
 Mack Sennett as The Servant
 Florence Lawrence
 John Tansey

References

External links
 

1909 films
1909 drama films
1909 short films
Silent American drama films
American silent short films
American black-and-white films
Films directed by D. W. Griffith
1900s American films
American drama short films
1900s English-language films